Thomas Hayter  (1702 – 9 January 1762) was an English whig divine, who served as a Church of England bishop for 13 years, and was a royal chaplain. As a party advocate of the Pelhamites and a friend of the Duke of Newcastle, he was at the height of his powers in the 1750s.  A scholar renowned in his days, it was for his divinity that Hayter was recommended, but his friendship with the court and royalty that exemplified his actual powers.  He was considered tolerant and eclectic, learned and intelligent.

Life
He was born in Chagford, Devon, officially the son of George Hayter; it has often been claimed that Lancelot Blackburne was his father, but there is no conclusive evidence. Blackburne sizeable portion of his estate to Hayter.

Hayter studied at Blundell's School, Tiverton, and matriculated at Balliol College, Oxford on 30 May 1720, where he graduated BA on 21 January 1724. He took further degrees at Emmanuel College, Cambridge (MA 1727) and DD (1744).

He was ordained deacon and priest in 1727. He was appointed private chaplain to Archbishop Lancelot Blackburne of York, then made Prebendary of York (1728-1749), Prebendary of Southwell (1728-1749), Rector of Kirkby Overblow, Yorkshire (1729-1749), Sub-dean of York (1730-1749), Archdeacon of York (1730-1751), Rector of Etton, Yorkshire (1731), Chaplain to the King (1734-1749), Vicar of Kirkby-in-Cleveland, (1737-1749) and Prebendary of Westminster (1739-1749). Holding three prebendal stalls in succession in the northern episcopate marked him out for high promotion as he rose through the York chapter.  He was Bishop of Norwich from 1749 to 1761. He had been elected a Fellow of the Royal Society in March 1750 
he secured the dismissal of two Jacobite tutors in 1755 named Stone and Scott for seditious attempts to influence the Prince George in the ways of Jacobitism.  In later life George III was a self-evident Tory but had learnt a hard lesson in politics from his learned counsel. He was a revelatory evangelist at the pulpit, a doctrinal latitudinarian, condemned mishandling of the poor, and urged temperance, and wider acceptance of clandestine marriages. "...the very ideas we form of them arise from their being distributed among Men in various Degrees and Proportions.  They are indeed by the Appointment of God, adjusted by the Scheme of Things in this world only", exemplified a sophisticated aristocratic notion of how Man came down. However he then went on to qualify his remarks "...The Original quality of Human nature still subsists under all these external Distinctions..." his theology strongly upheld the goodness of human sensibilities as it permeates human consciousness.  Yet he was a Man of the World "protecting the Innocent, countenancing the Virtuous, and spreading Prosperity, through Whole Nations." Warning  of the uneasiness of vice, he yet remained uncloistered and enlightened.  A moderate whig he asked the eternal question Does Temperance injure the Mind? asking those difficult questions posed by London living. In 1758, Hayter asked noted surgeon Benjamin Gooch to visit all the great hospitals in London with a view to building a general hospital for the County of Norfolk and the City of Norwich jointly. After Bishop Hayter's death in 1762, a friend and wealthy landowner, William Fellowes of Shotesham Park, stepped in "to revive the plan" and Norfolk and Norwich Hospital was founded in 1771.

It was the death of Frederick, Prince of Wales that precipitated his nomination as tutor to the Princess's household.  In 1751, Hayter was chosen to replace Francis Ayscough as the tutor to the future George III. Impressed, Newcastle, also a friend, called him "a sensible and well-bred man", pro-Establishment leanings, earned excoriating criticism from the septic society gossip Horace Walpole.  The whiggish dislike of the Princess doting over her many children was largely blamed on Hayter's seemingly Tory-inspired influences, often misinterpreted as mischievous.  Nonetheless Hayter remained in favour at court. His conduct with Prince George, the future king, earned praise from the staid The Gentleman's Magazine

In the House of Lords Hayter took a surprisingly liberal stance on the Jewish Naturalisation bill, for which he was roundly insulted at York. Feeling weak and frequently feverish he joined the royals on their habitual progresses to the Spa towns of the west of England. In 1758 he preached a renowned sermon at London's Guildhall in front of the Duke of Devonshire to inspire the government on the treatment of patients at the Foundling Hospital in St Bartholomew's. He was seen taking the waters at Malvern as early as 1761 for rheumatic pains.

Hayter gained preferment as Bishop of London on 19 September 1761, was made a Privy Councillor the same year.  He was patronised by Lord Talbot, the Catholic nobleman, who secured his nomination at Bow Church in the East End to be Bishop of London on 24 October 1761 where he was ordained.  As bishop of London he held the subsidiary post of dean of the Chapel Royal, a post he held until his death on 9 January 1762 at his house in Lisle Street, Leicester Fields, London from dropsy. He was recognised by the erection of a white marble tomb and was buried in the churchyard of All Saints Church, Fulham, London, on 16 January 1762.

References

Bibliography
 Nichols, Literary Anecdotes, iii. 617, viii. 227, ix. pp. 295, 300–1, 505–6
 Horace Walpole, George II, i. pp. 74, 247–8, 253, 284
 Horace Walpole, George III, i. 73–4;
 Horace Walpole, Letters, ii. 250, 293, 316–17, vii. 472
 Coxe, Pelham, ii. pp. 167, 236–9, 290, 440;
 Harris, Life of Lord Hardwicke, iii. 484;
 Quarterly Review 1822, xxvii. 187;
 Burke, Landed Gentry, ed. 1886, i. 819;
 Francis Le Neve, Fasti Anglicanae, ii. pp. 305, 474, iii. 130, 135, 210, 216, 431;
 Incledon, Donations of P. Blundell, App. p. 52;
 Halkett and Laing, Anonymous Literature, i. 807, 844;
 Faulkner's Fulham, p. 106;
 Daniel Lysons,  Environs of London, ii. 390.

External links

 Papers and correspondence

1702 births
1762 deaths
People educated at Blundell's School
Alumni of Emmanuel College, Cambridge
Alumni of Balliol College, Oxford
18th-century Church of England bishops
Bishops of London
Deans of the Chapel Royal
Bishops of Norwich
Chancellors of the College of William & Mary
Fellows of the Royal Society
Canons of Westminster
Members of the Privy Council of Great Britain
Burials at All Saints Church, Fulham